Dissacus is a genus of extinct carnivorous jackal to coyote-sized mammals within the family Mesonychidae, an early group of hoofed mammals that evolved into hunters and omnivores.

Orientation patch analysis of the molar teeth of the North American D. praenuntius suggests it was an omnivore that ate a lot of meat, not an exclusive meat-eater like a cat or weasel. It shared its environment with more omnivorous mammals of a similar body size. Though they are not ancestral to Carnivora, Dissacus species may have had similar roles in Paleocene-early Eocene environments as the foxes and other small canids that evolved later: generalized hunters who also ate fruit or other foods, and caught small animals that lived on the ground.

The bear-sized Ankalagon is closely related to Dissacus. Some paleontologists consider it a sister or daughter genus, while others suggest Ankalagon is just larger species of Dissacus, and that Dissacus is paraphyletic.

Dissacus species lived across the Northern hemisphere, a Holarctic distribution. Dissacus europaeus may have evolved in North America and migrated to Europe, and first appears in European strata in the Thanetian (circa 57-58 MYA). A phylogenetic analysis of European mesonychids suggests that Dissacus was part of an early diversification of species in the Paleocene, and other genera diversified in a later episode in the early Eocene. D. europaeus survived the Paleocene-Eocene Thermal Maximum, a period of severe global warming, which suggests it had flexible habits. Its distribution in Europe over time suggests it may have been unable to expand into areas occupied by Pachyaena, which may mean it filled a similar ecological role. However, fossil records are still too incomplete for any conclusion. The fossil record of D. europaeus is fragmentary; remains in Cernay, France, include a mandible, a complete radius, and fragments of a humerus. A morphological study of these bones suggests this animal was digitigrade and more cursorial than is usually assumed for the genus.
 Analysis of the elbow joint shows it was specialized for extra flexion and extension, an adaptation usually found in running species; the amount of specialization is unusual for a Paleocene mammal. This does not mean Dissacus species were swift runners by modern standards, but that D. europaeus was more adapted for running than other mammals of its time. It may be part of a trend among early Cenozoic mammals toward developing more specialized bodies to fill different ecological niches.

Species

Genus Dissacus
Dissacus argenteus
Dissacus europaeus
Dissacus indigenus
Dissacus magushanensis
Dissacus navajovius
Dissacus praenuntius
Dissacus raslanloubatieri
Dissacus rotundus
Dissacus rougierae
Dissacus serior
Dissacus serratus
Dissacus willwoodensis
Dissacus zanabazari
Dissacus zengi

References

Fossils of France
Fossils of China
Mesonychids
Paleocene mammals
Eocene mammals
Eocene genus extinctions
Danian first appearances
Fossil taxa described in 1881
Prehistoric placental genera